Maic Ndongala Namputu Sema (born 2 December 1988) is a Swedish professional footballer who plays for IFK Norrköping.

Career
Sema was born in Lycksele. Until 2011, he played for Hammarby IF, where he came from IF Sylvia summer 2008. In the 2011 season, he made 10 goals for Hammarby and was elected by the fans as Player of the Year. In January 2012 Sema went to Norwegian FK Haugesund. He was loaned out to MVV Maastricht in the Dutch Eerste Divisie in 2013.

He left Haugesund after the 2014 season. He later had a short spell at Cypriot First Division side, AEL Limassol, before becoming a free agent at the end of the
2014–15 season. He was most recently trialing with Blackburn Rovers, appearing in a friendly match against Tranmere Rovers, in which his team won 2–0.

In March 2018, Maic Sema joined GIF Sundsvall in Allsvenskan.

In August 2019, Maic Sema joined the main club of his home town, IFK Norrköping.

Personal life
Sema was born in Sweden to Congolese parents, his brother Ken Sema is also a footballer.

Career statistics

References

External links
 
 

1988 births
Living people
People from Lycksele Municipality
Swedish footballers
Swedish people of Democratic Republic of the Congo descent
Swedish sportspeople of African descent
Association football forwards
IF Sylvia players
Hammarby Fotboll players
FK Haugesund players
MVV Maastricht players
AEL Limassol players
Örebro SK players
NorthEast United FC players
GIF Sundsvall players
IFK Norrköping players
Superettan players
Allsvenskan players
Eliteserien players
Eerste Divisie players
Indian Super League players
Cypriot First Division players
Swedish expatriate footballers
Expatriate footballers in Norway
Swedish expatriate sportspeople in Norway
Expatriate footballers in the Netherlands
Swedish expatriate sportspeople in the Netherlands
Expatriate footballers in Cyprus
Swedish expatriate sportspeople in Cyprus
Sportspeople from Västerbotten County